The Embassy of the People's Republic of China in Peru is the diplomatic mission of the People's Republic of China to Peru. The embassy is serviced by the Chinese ambassador to Peru.

History
The old embassy was opened in 1972, one year after the government of Juan Velasco Alvarado recognized the People's Republic of China instead of the Republic of China as the sole government of China. It was located at Jesus Maria. The Taiwanese government only opened a representative office six years later, in 1978.

In 1985, during the internal conflict in Peru, the embassy was bombed alongside the Soviet and U.S. embassies. The attacks were carried out with dynamite, with the attack on the Chinese embassy destroying its front door. In 2000, the embassy was relocated to San Isidro. On January 25, 2023, the building's main entrance was blocked by protestors as part of a series of protests by supporters of former president Pedro Castillo.

See also
China–Peru relations
Taipei Economic and Cultural Representative Office in Peru

Notes

References

Diplomatic missions of China
China
China–Peru relations